Isaiah Battle (born February 10, 1993) is an American football offensive tackle for the New Jersey Generals of the United States Football League (USFL). He was drafted by the St. Louis Rams in the fifth round of the 2015 Supplemental Draft and played college football at Clemson.

Professional career 
Battle declared for the NFL Supplemental Draft, claiming that it was in his best interest. It was later stated that Battle had committed his "third and final strike" as the reason he declared for supplemental draft. He was originally given a third round grade by many draft experts. On July 7, 2015, Battle held his Pro Day with 26 teams in attendance.

St. Louis Rams
Battle was taken in the fifth round of the supplemental draft by the St. Louis Rams giving up their fifth round pick in the 2016 NFL Draft. On July 27, 2015 Battle signed a four-year contract worth $2,508,864 with $228,864 guaranteed. On September 5, he was waived and subsequently signed to the practice squad. On November 18, 2015, he was signed to the active roster after Jamon Brown and Darrell Williams were placed on the injured reserve.

On September 3, 2016, Battle was waived by the Rams as part of final roster cuts and was signed to the practice squad the next day.

Kansas City Chiefs
On January 4, 2017, Battle signed a reserve/future contract with the Chiefs.

Seattle Seahawks
On September 2, 2017, Battle was traded to the Seattle Seahawks. On November 1, 2017, Battle was waived by the Seahawks and re-signed to the practice squad. He was released on December 2, 2017, but was re-signed three days later. He signed a reserve/future contract with the Seahawks on January 2, 2018.

On September 1, 2018, Battle was waived by the Seahawks.

Carolina Panthers
On December 31, 2018, Battle signed a reserve/future contract with the Carolina Panthers. He was waived on May 6, 2019.

Seattle Dragons
On October 15, 2019, Battle was drafted in the 1st round of the 2020 XFL Draft by the Seattle Dragons. He missed the first two games of the season with an ankle injury. He had his contract terminated when the league suspended operations on April 10, 2020.

USFL
On February 22, 2022, Battle was drafted in the sixth round of the 2022 USFL Draft by the Pittsburgh Maulers. On April 1, 2022, Battle was placed on the Reserve/Did Not Report list after failing to report to the team. He had his playing rights transferred to the New Jersey Generals on October 20, 2022.

References 

American football offensive tackles
Living people
Clemson Tigers football players
St. Louis Rams players
Los Angeles Rams players
1993 births
Sportspeople from Brooklyn
Players of American football from New York City
Kansas City Chiefs players
Seattle Seahawks players
Carolina Panthers players
Seattle Dragons players
Pittsburgh Maulers (2022) players
New Jersey Generals (2022) players